Blastobasis bispinaella is a moth in the family Blastobasidae. It is found in Thailand.

The length of the forewings is 5.5 mm. The basal two-thirds of the forewings is pale brown intermixed with brown and a few white scales. The distal third is brown intermixed with a few pale brown and white scales. The hindwings are pale brown.

Etymology
The species name is derived from Latin basis (meaning base) and spina (meaning spine) and refers to the two spine-like projections on the basal margin of the lower part of the valva.

References

Moths described in 2003
Blastobasis